Sherwood station  may refer to:

 Sherwood railway station, station on the former Great Northern Railway Nottingham Suburban railway in Nottingham, England
 Sherwood Park railway station, Victoria, Australia
 Sherwood railway station, Brisbane, Queensland, Australia
 Sherwood railway station, Perth, Western Australia, Australia